Aaron Stone is a  Disney XD series that premiered on February 13, 2009 and ended on July 30, 2010. A total of 35 episodes were produced spanning 2 seasons.

Series overview
{| class="wikitable plainrowheaders" style="text-align:center;"
|-
! colspan="2" rowspan="2" |Season
! rowspan="2" |Episodes
! colspan="2" |Originally aired
|-
! First aired
! Last aired
|-
| style="background:#689CCF; color:#100; text-align:center;"|
| [[List of Aaron Stone episodes#Season 1 (2009)|1]]
| 21
| February 13, 2009
| January 4, 2010
|-
| style="background:#FF9933; color:#100; text-align:center;"| 
| [[List of Aaron Stone episodes#Season 2 (2010)|2]]
| 14
| March 4, 2010
| August 31, 2010
|}

Episodes

Season 1 (2009)

Season 2 (2010)

References

Lists of American science fiction television series episodes